December Pookal is a 1986 Indian Tamil-language slasher film starring Mohan, Revathi, Nalini and Nizhalgal Ravi, Goundamani and Senthil. It was released on 14 January 1986.

Plot 

Chandru loses his wife in an accident, then goes on a killing spree, murdering all those women who refused to donate blood to his wife when she was hospitalised. Poornima, Chandru's new girlfriend, confronts him about his state of mind, but instead of getting him help, she tells him that she feels privileged to be killed by him. The police arrive on time to shoot Chandru in the back.

Cast 

 Mohan as Chandru
 Revathi as Poornima
 Nalini as Uma
 Nizhalgal Ravi as Inspector Vinoth
 Goundamani as Mayilsamy
 Senthil as Senthil Kumaran
 Sivachandran
 Ilavarasan
 V. Gopalakrishnan as Poornima's father
 Delhi Ganesh as Seshadri
 Chinni Jayanth as Chandru's Assistant
 Y. Vijaya as Manonmani
 Kuyili as Sarasu
 Kumarimuthu as Police constable
Omakuchi Narasimhan
Master Haja Sheriff
MLA Thangaraj

Soundtrack 
The music was composed by Ilaiyaraaja.

Reception 
Kalki said the cinematography by Raja Rajan was the film's only high point.

References

External links 
 

1980s slasher films
1980s Tamil-language films
1986 films
Films scored by Ilaiyaraaja
Indian slasher films